WASP-12 is a magnitude 11 yellow dwarf star located approximately 1410 light-years away in the constellation Auriga. WASP-12 has a mass and radius similar to the Sun and is known for being orbited by a planet that is extremely hot and has a retrograde orbit around WASP-12. WASP-12 forms a triple star system with two red dwarf companions. Both of them have spectral types of M3V and are only 38% and 37% as massive as the Sun, respectively.

Planetary system
In 2008, the extrasolar planet WASP-12b was discovered orbiting WASP-12 by the transit method. Its high carbon-to-oxygen ratio indicates that rocky planets might have formed in the star system, and it may be a carbon planet. It is subject to intensive photo-evaporation, and may be completely destroyed within one billion years from now.

In 2015, no indications of additional planets were found in the WASP-12 system.

See also
 Lists of planets
 SuperWASP

References

External links
 WASP-12b in transit (lightcurve)
 

Auriga (constellation)
G-type main-sequence stars
Planetary systems with one confirmed planet
Planetary transit variables
Triple star systems
J06303279+2940202
12
3